Unnaiye Kadhalipen is a 2010 Indian Tamil language romantic drama film directed by A. R. Sivajidass. The film stars Rathan Mouli, Anjali Nair, R. R. Velu and Sushma, with Ramesh, Velmurugan, Cheyyar Selvadurai and Cheyyar Mani playing supporting roles. The film, produced B. Sudhakar, had a musical score by P. R. Srinarth and was released on 22 October 2010.

Plot
In a remote village, Saravanan (Rathan Mouli) is a good-for-nothing youngster living with his mother Veeramma. When he was a kid, his father left them to marry his former lover Bhagyam. The landlord Sadasivam runs in the panchayat election and his brother Aadhi tries his best to make him win and even bribes the voters. On the other hand, Saravanan and his friends support the do-gooder Shangugam for the election and Shangugam wins it by a big margin. After this humiliation, Saravanan becomes Aadhi's archenemy and Aadhi vows to take revenge.

Sindhu (Sushma) arrives at the village as the new school teacher and Saravanan helps her to settle down in the village. The villagers then start to talk bad about their relationship. Meanwhile, Aadhi gets engaged to the village belle Vaidehi (Anjali Nair). One day, Saravanan takes the feverish Sindhu by cycle to the hospital and he then drops her at home but he forgets to give her medicines and Sindhu tries to catch him. The night, Saravanan drinks alcohol with his friends. The next day, a drunk Saravanan is found near the dead body of Sindhu and he is arrested by the police. Later, Aadhi reveals to his friends that he had raped Sindhu that night. Vaidehi and her father who have listened to his conversation testify against Aadhi, hence Saravanan is released from jail and Aadhi is arrested.

Thereafter, Saravanan and Vaidehi fall in love with each other and they eventually get engaged. In the meantime, Saravanan and his mother reconcile with his father, his stepmother and his stepsister. Aadhi who gets released on bail rapes Vaidehi in a remote place and kills her by stoning her. The film ends with Saravanan killing Aadhi and mourning the death of his lover.

Cast

Rathan Mouli as Saravanan
Anjali Nair as Vaidehi
R. R. Velu as Aadhi
Sushma as Sindhu
Ramesh
Velmurugan
Cheyyar Selvadurai as Sokkamuthu
Cheyyar Mani as Thippili 
Ramulu
Kovai Saravanan
Ravi
Vinoth
Mahesh
Vinitha as Saravanan's stepsister
Malar
Bava Sudha
Pavline
Jennifer in a special appearance

Production
A. R. Sivajidass made his directorial debut with Unnaiye Kadhalipen under the banner of Saravanaa Film Maker. Newcomer Rathan Mouli was chosen to play the lead role, while newcomers Anjali Nair from Kerala and Sushma were chosen to play the heroines. R. R. Velu signed to play the main antagonist and drama artist Cheyyar Selvadurai was cast to play the comedian. In October 2010, Anjali Nair filed a police complaint in Chennai against her co-star R. R. Velu alleging that he stalked her and he constantly pestered her to marry him.

Soundtrack

The film score and the soundtrack were composed by P. R. Srinarth. The soundtrack features 5 tracks.

Release
The film was released on 22 October 2010 alongside four other films.

References

2010 films
2010s Tamil-language films
2010 romantic drama films
Indian romantic drama films
2010 directorial debut films